Hexokinase 3 also known as HK3 is an enzyme which in humans is encoded by the HK3 gene on chromosome 5. Hexokinases phosphorylate glucose to produce glucose-6-phosphate (G6P), the first step in most glucose metabolism pathways. This gene encodes hexokinase 3. Similar to hexokinases 1 and 2, this allosteric enzyme is inhibited by its product glucose-6-phosphate. [provided by RefSeq, Apr 2009]

Structure
HK3 is one of four highly homologous hexokinase isoforms in mammalian cells. This protein has a molecular weight of 100 kDa and is composed of two highly similar 50-kDa domains at its N- and C-terminals. This high similarity, along with the and the existence of a 50-kDa hexokinase (HK4), suggests that the 100-kDa hexokinases originated from a 50-kDa precursor via gene duplication and tandem ligation. Like with HK1, only the C-terminal domain possesses catalytic ability, whereas the N-terminal domain is predicted to contain glucose and G6P binding sites, as well as a 32-residue region essential for proper protein folding. Moreover, the catalytic activity depends on the interaction between the two terminal domains. Unlike HK1 and HK2, HK3 lacks a mitochondrial binding sequence at its N-terminal.

Function 
As a cytoplasmic isoform of hexokinase and a member of the sugar kinase family, HK3 catalyzes the rate-limiting and first obligatory step of glucose metabolism, which is the ATP-dependent phosphorylation of glucose to G6P. Physiological levels of G6P can regulate this process by inhibiting HK3 as negative feedback, though inorganic phosphate can relieve G6P inhibition. Inorganic phosphate can also directly regulate HK3, and the double regulation may better suit its anabolic functions. By phosphorylating glucose, HK3 effectively prevents glucose from leaving the cell and, thus, commits glucose to energy metabolism. Compared to HK1 and HK2, HK3 possesses a higher affinity for glucose and will bind the substrate even at physiological levels, though this binding may be attenuated by intracellular ATP. Uniquely, HK3 can be inhibited by glucose at high concentrations. HK3 is also less sensitive to G6P inhibition.

Despite its lack of mitochondrial association, HK3 also functions to protect the cell against apoptosis. Overexpression of HK3 has resulted in increased ATP levels, decreased reactive oxygen species (ROS) production, attenuated reduction in the mitochondrial membrane potential, and enhanced mitochondrial biogenesis. Overall, HK3 may promote cell survival by controlling ROS levels and boosting energy production. Currently, only hypoxia is known to induce HK3 expression through a HIF-dependent pathway. The inducible expression of HK3 indicates its adaptive role in metabolic responses to changes in the cellular environment.

In particular, HK3 is ubiquitously expressed in tissues, albeit at relatively low abundance. Higher abundance levels have been cited in lung, kidney, and liver tissue. Within cells, HK3 localizes to the cytoplasm and putatively binds the perinuclear envelope. HK3 is the predominant hexokinase in myeloid cells, particularly granulocytes.

Clinical significance
HK3 is found to be overexpressed in malignant follicular thyroid nodules. In conjunction with cyclin A and galectin-3, HK3 could be used as diagnostic biomarker to screen for malignancy in patients. Meanwhile, HK3 was found to be repressed in acute myeloid leukemia (AML) blast cells and acute promyelocytic leukemia (APL) patients. The transcription factor PU.1 is known to directly activate transcription of the antiapoptotic BCL2A1 gene or inhibit transcription of the p53 tumor suppressor to promote cell survival, and is proposed to also directly activate HK3 transcription during neutrophil differentiation to support short-term cell survival of mature neutrophils. Regulators repressing HK3 expression in AML include PML-RARA and CEBPA. Regarding acute lymphoblastic leukemia (ALL), functional enrichment analysis revealed HK3 as a key gene and suggests that HK3 shares antiapoptotic function with HK1 and HK2.

Interactions 
The HK3 promoter is known to interact with PU.1, PML-RARA, and CEBPA.

Interactive pathway map

See also 
Hexokinase
HK1
HK2
Glucokinase

References

Further reading

External links